The 2014 D.C. United season was the club's nineteenth season of existence, and their nineteenth in Major League Soccer, the top tier of the American soccer pyramid.

Outside of MLS regular season play, the club is going to be participating in the 2014 U.S. Open Cup, in which they are the defending champions, as well as the 2014–15 CONCACAF Champions League. It is United's first appearance in the Champions League since the 2009–10 campaign. Ahead of the MLS regular season campaign, United will participate in the 2014 Carolina Challenge Cup.

Background

Pre-season
After an abysmal 2013 campaign that saw the team break several negative MLS records, the team swapped out over half of its roster. Several starters from 2013 were released or simply let go, including starters like Lionard Pajoy, Dwayne De Rosario, and James Riley among others. In their place, the team gathered several players from other teams, including Davy Arnaud from Montreal, Bobby Boswell from Houston, and Eddie Johnson from Seattle.

Ben Olsen and Dave Kasper were allowed to stay on as Head Coach and General Manager (respectively) of the team.

By the time the first match of the MLS season came around, only 4 of the starting 11 had stayed with the team from last year. Unfortunately, prospective starting midfielder Chris Pontius suffered a serious hamstring injury and was pronounced out for most of the season. His spot was given to fellow midfielder Perry Kitchen.

March
The season started on a bad note, with a relatively new Columbus Crew beating a disorganized D.C. United side at home 3-0, and then a 1-0 loss to a surprisingly hot Toronto FC side. However, the team began showing signs of life in a home game against the Chicago Fire. Though the game ended in a 2-2 draw, the newly signed Fabian Espindola and the promoted Kitchen helped to give D.C. United a 2-1 lead in the second half, something the team had not had in MLS season play in a while.

April
D.C. United went on a roll, adding a 3-0-1 tally throughout the month. Former Chicago Fire midfielder Chris Rolfe, signed to shore up the midfield in the absence of Pontius, made an immediate impact in his first game with the team. In a game against the New England Revolution, he scored a brace in the closing seconds of stoppage time, contributing to the team's 2-0 victory. DC then tacked on another victory against the New York Red Bulls, as the team's defense–--combined with some lucky breaks---managed to hold on to a one-goal lead for most of the match.

DC almost won a third straight match at Columbus in a rematch against the Crew, but for a mistake by Espindola which led to a goal by Crew forward Hector Jiménez that allowed them to tie the match near the end of the second half. DC ended up settling for a draw. Back at home, DC would get a crushing victory after an early red card on an FC Dallas player allowed the team, led by Espindola, to rack up a 4-1 victory.

May
Poor marking on defense and an anemic offense allowed the struggling Portland Timbers to sneak away with a 3-2 victory in the dying seconds of the match. It was a familiar tune that would repeat itself over the next few games as D.C. United barely held on to a 1-0 victory in Philadelphia, and managed to salvage a 1-1 draw against the cellar-dwelling Montreal Impact thanks to DC forward Eddie Johnson scoring his first goal on the season. The team did much better in their following match against Houston, getting a 2-0 victory at home. Then they fell apart in the second half of a match against the Revolution in Foxboro, losing both the game 2-1 and Johnson to a red card suspension.

Back home against Sporting KC, the team held on to an Espindola goal to win the match 1-0, but starting defender Jeff Parke left the game due to a foot injury. He would be replaced by rookie defender Steve Birnbaum.

June
After a friendly between Spain and El Salvador, D.C. United played the second half of a doubleheader of soccer action in FedExField in Landover, against the Columbus Crew. The game ended in a 0-0 draw, with Espindola chipping a penalty kick right into the opposing goalkeeper's hands in the final minutes of play. A few days later, the team travelled to Montreal and beat the Impact 4-2, with Luis Silva earning his first-ever hat trick for the team. Unfortunately, Espindola suffered an MCL sprain during this match, and would be sidelined for at least 8 weeks.

Following this game, the entire league took two weeks off for the 2014 FIFA World Cup, as many of its star players were busy playing for their respective national teams in the Cup. During this break, D.C. United played a match in the fourth round of the 2014 U.S. Open Cup against the Rochester Rhinos, but unlike last year, Ben Olsen downplayed the significance of the tournament and fielded a team of mostly reserve players. The team was eliminated in a quiet 1-0 defeat, the only highlight of the match for DC was Birnbaum being sent off in the 60th minute.

On the 28th, D.C. United resumed league play against the Seattle Sounders, where they lost 1-0 at home.

July
At the start of the month, Christian mutually terminated his contract with the team, claiming that he did not feel comfortable playing in Washington and wished to go back to Spain. His spot on the starting lineup was taken by Chris Korb.

Four days later, DC travelled to Toronto and won 2-1, thanks to a pair of stylish goals from midfielders Perry Kitchen and Nick DeLeon. Afterwards, the team travelled to San Jose to face the Earthquakes, and managed to win 2-1 thanks to a combination of a successful Eddie Johnson penalty kick and Bill Hamid making miraculous saves in the dying minutes of the match. The team travelled back home to Washington to face the surging Chivas USA, and defeated them 3-1. Johnson scored his third goal of the season (and second from a penalty kick) in that match. During this time, Parke recovered from his foot injury, but immediately suffered painful migraine headaches that kept him on the sidelines.

On the 26th, the team travelled to Jacksonville to play a friendly against Fulham F.C., as an opening act for the newly expanded EverBank Field. While fielding a team of reserves, DC lost 3-0 as Moussa Dembélé scored a hat trick on the team and DC goalkeeper Andrew Dykstra tore his Achilles tendon, ending his season prematurely. Kyle Porter and Alex Caskey also left the game with injuries.

A few days later, DC acquired Kofi Opare from the LA Galaxy in a trade and defeated Toronto 3-0 at home.

August
D.C. United began August with a pair of road losses, but the team recovered to post some strong results and finished the month on top of the Eastern Conference standings. With Chris Korb out, Taylor Kemp made his first start at left back. Despite an early yellow card on Kemp, D.C. United seemed poised to take a rare point in Houston, when Will Bruin beat Kemp and Birnbaum to get on the end of a long pass in added time and scored the lone goal in a 1-0 win for the Dynamo. D.C. United next traveled to Utah to play Real Salt Lake. Although Espindola returned to action in the second half after a prolonged injury absence, RSL scored 3 times in the first half to hand DC its second straight loss. Eddie Johnson received a red card and so would miss the next MLS match.

A Sunday night match at RFK saw D.C. United break out of a scoring slump, with 4 goals against the Colorado Rapids. Luis Silva scored twice, including one off Kemp's first MLS assist. Rolfe and Espindola had the other goals. Three nights later, a lineup that featured Eddie Johnson and 10 D.C. United reserves opened up the team's group play in the 2014-15 CONCACAF Champions League with a 1-0 home win against Jamaican side Waterhouse FC on an early goal by Johnson.

United went on the road for a game 3 nights later against division-leading Sporting Kansas City. With first-half goals by Espindola, Rolfe and Kitchen, DC surprised SKC by a 3-0 score to take over the top spot in the MLS Eastern Conference. Coach Ben Olsen rested several starters on a road match in Los Angeles, and the team suffered a hard loss, losing 4-1 to the LA Galaxy. 4 days later, D.C. United rebounded at home, riding goals by Silva and Espindola to a 2-0 win over New York Red Bulls, leaving D.C. United 4 points clear in the Eastern Conference race.

September
Before heading out on the road for a match against Vancouver Whitecaps, D.C. United added a Ghana international, Samuel Inkoom. Once again, DC started the month slowly, with a draw in Vancouver, followed four days later by a heartbreaking road loss to New York Red Bulls. United lost Chris Rolfe to a broken arm injury suffered in practice prior to the game against NYRB. Despite playing a man down for most of the match after Espindola was red-carded, United seemed destined to hold on for a draw until Lloyd Sam's stoppage-time goal won the night for the Red Bulls. The game marked the first MLS action of the season for Pontius, who came on as a second-half substitute.

With Espindola forced to miss the next MLS match, Olsen started Espindola in the return match against Waterhouse FC in Jamaica in CONCACAF group play. Espindola had both D.C. United goals in a 2-1 win for the MLS team.

Next, D.C. United traveled to Chicago to play the Chicago Fire, and the DC team rallied from a 2-0 deficit to get a point in a 3-3 draw. DC went ahead 3-2 on a pair of goals by Silva and a goal by Boswell before the team once again lost points on a late goal by the Fire.

The team returned to RFK for another CONCACAF Champions League match, this time facing struggling Panamanian side Tauro FC. With goals by Johnson and Pontius, and an assist by Inkoom, D.C. United earned a 2-0 win over Tauro, and clinched the top spot in the group and a place in the quarterfinals.

When the team resumed MLS action four days after the Tauro match, DC fans turned out in big numbers, with the biggest home crowd in nearly two years. 19,478 fans watched D.C. United defeat the Philadelphia Union on a header for a goal by Silva. The assist went to Korb, who was playing in his first MLS match since injuring his hamstring on August 9.

October
Pontius made his first MLS start of the year for a home match against Sporting Kansas City. The goalless draw was enough for D.C. United to clinch a playoff berth. The good news kept coming for D.C. United, as the team next won for the first time ever in Houston, defeating the Dynamo 3-1 on goals by Kemp, Espindola and Johnson. The one sour note for DC was a hamstring injury suffered by Silva after play had resumed following a lengthy rain delay.

On October 18, D.C. United completed its worst-to-first turnaround. A 2-1 home win before a sellout crowd at RFK clinched first place and the top seed in the Eastern Conference playoffs. Pontius scored his first league goal in over a year, and Johnson capped off the scoring for D.C. United.

Three days later, a team of reserves traveled to Panama. A fluke goal on a ball that ricocheted off Conor Shanosky's head was enough for a 1-0 D.C. United win. This win meant that D.C. United earned the full 12 points, the only team in group play to do so. As a result, United gained the top seed heading into the quarterfinal round of CONCACAF Champions League play in February 2015.

The final match of the regular season took United across the northern border, where the team fell behind to the Montreal Impact on a goal by Marco Di Vaio in his final game. A late goal by Espindola got a point for D.C. United, closing out the regular season as the first place team in the Eastern Conference and in third-place overall in the MLS Supporters Shield race. United completed the largest turnaround in points from one MLS season to the next.

November
An injury-depleted D.C. United squad traveled to Red Bull Arena for a playoff match against New York Red Bulls. United fell 2-0 on goals by Bradley Wright-Phillips and Peguy Luyindola. Needing at least two goals in the return match at RFK, D.C. United got a first half goal from Nick DeLeon to set the stage for an improbable comeback. However, another goal by Luyindula, on an assist by Thierry Henry, sealed D.C. United's fate. A late goal by Sean Franklin was not nearly enough to send the home-and-home series to overtime, as NYRB defeated D.C. United by an aggregate 3-2 score.

December
Awards season saw D.C. United get several honors. Bobby Boswell was named MLS Defender of the Year. Bill Hamid was MLS Goalie of the Year and Ben Olsen was named MLS Coach of the Year.

In roster moves, D.C. United added Thomas McNamara in the dispersal draft that allocated players from disbanded Chivas USA. However, McNamara was selected by New York City in the subsequent MLS expansion draft. Orlando City SC also took a D.C. United player, Lewis Neal. Prior to the expansion draft, D.C. United traded Joe Willis and Inkoom to Houston in exchange for Andrew Driver, a move that allowed the team to protect an additional domestic player in the expansion draft.

Squad 
As of October 2, 2014.

Competitions

Preseason

Florida training camp

Carolina Challenge Cup

Major League Soccer

Overall table

Eastern Conference standings

Results summary

Results by round

Match results

MLS Cup Playoffs

Conference semifinals

CONCACAF Champions League

Group stage

Knockout stage

U.S. Open Cup

Midseason friendlies

Statistics

Appearances and goals 

|-
|colspan="14"|Players who left the club during the 2014 season
|-

|-                                                                                                                                                                                                                       
|}

Statistics current as of August 20, 2014
Sources: D.C. United Season Statistics; DC United Squad - ESPN FC

Top scorers

Top assists

Transfers

In

Out

Loan out

See also 
 D.C. United
 List of D.C. United seasons
 2014 Major League Soccer season
 2014 MLS Cup Playoffs
 2014 U.S. Open Cup
 2014–15 CONCACAF Champions League
 2014 in American soccer

References 

D.C. United seasons
D.C. United
D.C. United
2014 in sports in Washington, D.C.